Saskatchewan Polytechnic (formerly the Saskatchewan Institute of Applied Science and Technology or SIAST) is Saskatchewan's primary public institution for post-secondary technical education and skills training, recognized nationally and internationally for its expertise and innovation. Through program and course registrations, Saskatchewan Polytechnic serves 26,000 distinct students with programs that touch every sector of the economy. It operates campuses in Moose Jaw, Prince Albert, Regina and Saskatoon; and provides a number of courses and programs through distance education.

Saskatchewan Polytechnic maintains reciprocal arrangements with partner institutions, including: Dumont Technical Institute, First Nations University of Canada, Saskatchewan Indian Institute of Technologies, University of Regina, and the University of Saskatchewan.

Programs
Saskatchewan Polytechnic offers over 150 programs in applied/visual media, aviation, basic education, business, community/human services, engineering technology, health services, hospitality/food services, industrial/trades, natural resources, nursing, technology, recreation and tourism, and science. In addition, Saskatchewan Polytechnic provides training to apprentices in several trades.

Campus

Saskatchewan Polytechnic comprises four campuses in Saskatchewan:
 Saskatoon (formerly SIAST Kelsey Campus) 
Located at Idylwyld Drive North and 33rd Street East (southeast corner) in Saskatoon, the campus is named for Henry Kelsey, a famous fur trader and explorer. The institute in Saskatoon dates back to 1941 when The Canadian Vocational Training School was established to train veterans returning from the war.
 Moose Jaw (formerly SIAST Palliser Campus)
 Regina (formerly SIAST Wascana Campus)
 Prince Albert (formerly SIAST Woodland Campus)

History
The four schools that make up Saskatchewan Polytechnic started off as four individual schools. The Moose Jaw campus started off as the Saskatchewan Technical Institute in 1959. Saskatoon began as the Central Saskatchewan Technical Institute in 1963. Regina began as the Saskatchewan Institute of Applied Arts and Sciences in 1972. Prince Albert began as the Northern Institute of Technology in 1986. In January 1988, The Institute Act and the Regional Colleges Act amalgamated Saskatchewan's technical institutes, urban community colleges and the Advanced Technology Training Centre to form the Saskatchewan Institute of Applied Science and Technology (SIAST). The institution was named Saskatchewan Polytechnic on September 24, 2014.

Scholarships
Saskatchewan Polytechnic joined Project Hero, a scholarship program cofounded by General (Ret'd) Rick Hillier, for the families of fallen Canadian Forces members.

See also
 Higher education in Saskatchewan
 List of colleges in Canada#Saskatchewan

References

External links

 

Colleges in Saskatchewan
Educational institutions established in 1959
Vocational education in Canada
Education in Saskatoon
1959 establishments in Saskatchewan